Russell Hobbs, Inc. (formerly Salton, Inc.), was an American company based in Florida which manufactured home appliances, most notably the George Foreman grill and Russell Hobbs appliances. In June 2010, Russell Hobbs, Inc. was taken over by and became part of Spectrum Brands.

Company history 
Its headquarters were in Miramar, Florida. The company was founded in 1947 by Lou Salton, a Jewish immigrant from Poland.

In October 2000, Salton entered an exclusive license agreement with Synergy Worldwide to market and distribute the "Spin Fryer", designed by Reno R. Rolle, under the George Foreman brand.

In 2001, Salton bought the UK housewares and personal care company Pifco Group, which included the brands of Russell Hobbs, Carmen and Tower.

Salton also purchased Westclox in 2001, the name and other trademarks from the bankrupt General Time Corporation.

Salton was licensed to make small appliances, such as vacuum cleaners under the Westinghouse name, from 2002 to 2008.

On 6 August 2007, Salton was suspended from the NYSE. It was subsequently listed on the OTC Bulletin Board, changing its symbol from SFP to SFPI.

In October 2007, Salton sold its entire time products business, including the Westclox and Ingraham trademarks, to NYL Holdings LLC.

Salton merged with another small household appliance business, Applica Incorporated, in December of the same year, which owned the LitterMaid brand and a license to the Black and Decker brand for home appliances. Applica then became a wholly owned subsidiary of Salton, Inc. In December 2009, the combined company changed its name to Russell Hobbs, Inc.

A Canadian company with the name Salton Appliances (1985) Corp. continues to operate in the home appliance sector as an independent entity. There has never been any connection between Russell Hobbs, Inc. (formerly Salton, Inc.) and Salton Appliances (1985) Corp., which sells small kitchen appliances widely under Salton, Toastess, Delfino and private brands throughout the United States, Canada and Latin America.

Spectrum Brands
Spectrum Brands bought Russell Hobbs in 2010.

References

External links
Applica

Electronics companies established in 1947
Manufacturing companies based in Florida
Companies based in Broward County, Florida
Home appliance brands
Miramar, Florida
Home appliance manufacturers of the United States
2010 mergers and acquisitions